Skele is a surname. Notable people with the surname include:

Aigars Šķēle (born 1992), basketball player 
Andris Šķēle (born 1957), Latvian politician and business oligarch
Armands Šķēle (born 1983), Latvian basketball player
William Skele (disambiguation), multiple people